Syed Sajjad Haider "Yaldram" (1880 – 1943) was an Urdu short story writer, travel writer, translator, linguist, essayist, and humorist from British India.

Life 
He was born at Nehtaur village in Bijnor district of  the present day Uttar Pradesh state, India. He graduated from Aligarh Muslim University in 1901. He served in government services for 3 years in Baghdad where he learned Turkish language. He also worked in Aligarh University. He traveled to many Muslim countries.
Quratulain Hyder writes that he was sent by the British government to support the Young Turks movement in Turkey against the Ottoman Rule.

References

External link

Dawn.com

1880 births
1943 deaths
Urdu-language translators
Urdu-language travel writers
Urdu-language essayists
Urdu-language humorists
Urdu-language writers from British India
Aligarh Muslim University alumni
People from Bijnor district
Indian travel writers